Arietta is a hamlet located in the Town of Arietta in Hamilton County, New York, United States.

References

Hamlets in Hamilton County, New York
Hamlets in New York (state)